The 1999 Asian Cycling Championships took place at Green Dome Maebashi, Maebashi and Tsumagoi, Japan from 6 to 13 June 1999.

Medal summary

Road

Men

Women

Track

Men

Women

References
 www.cyclingnews.com
 Results
 Results

Asia
Asia
Cycling
Asian Cycling Championships
International cycle races hosted by Japan
Asian Cycling Championships